Liga Suporterilor Sibieni Voința Sibiu, commonly known as LSS Voința Sibiu, or simply as Voința Sibiu, is a Romanian football club from Sibiu, Sibiu County, founded in 2013 as a fan-owned phoenix club of the dissolved CSU Voința Sibiu. The club also has a women's football section.

History

CSU Voința continued the football tradition in Sibiu after the dissolution of FC Sibiu and FC Inter Sibiu. The club promoted from the Liga IV to the Liga I in just three seasons. However CSU Voința relegated after only one season of top football, finishing 16th in the table, with 32 points.

After only 11 rounds played in the 2012–13 Liga II Voința withdrew from the championship, because of immense debts.

A phoenix club was immediately created. In 2014 created plans to stage a "Football without owners" tournament on 10 January 2015, inviting other fan-owned phoenix clubs which have been formed due to the mismanagement of their original counterparts: Argeș 1953, ASU Politehnica Timișoara and FC Vaslui, at the event they finished on the second place.

On June 28, they won their first ever trophy the Sibiu County Phase of Romanian Cup, by defeating Silvatex Orlat (7–2) in the final.

Fans
The fans see LSS as the direct successor of CSU's heritage and therefore try to replicate this in every way. The supporters group are called Peluza Sud.

Honours

Domestic
Cupa României – Sibiu County
Winners (1): 2014–15

Friendly
Football without Owners Tournament
Runners-up (1): 2015

Club Officials

Board of directors

Current technical staff

League history

References

External links
 

Sibiu
Association football clubs established in 2013
Football clubs in Sibiu County
Fan-owned football clubs
2013 establishments in Romania
Liga IV clubs